Members of the New South Wales Legislative Assembly who served in the 48th parliament held their seats from 1984 to 1988. They were elected at the 1984 state election, and at by-elections. The Speaker was Laurie Kelly.

See also
Seventh Wran ministry
Eighth Wran ministry
Unsworth ministry
Results of the 1984 New South Wales state election (Legislative Assembly)
Candidates of the 1984 New South Wales state election

References

Members of New South Wales parliaments by term
20th-century Australian politicians